William Malone Baskervill (1850–1899) was a writer and professor of the English language and literature at Vanderbilt University.

Early life
William Malone Baskerville was born in 1850 in Fayette County, Tennessee. He graduated from Randolph–Macon College in Ashland, Virginia. One of his teacher, Thomas Randoph Price, encouraged him to study in Germany. As a result, he attended the University of Leipzig in 1873–1874, where he became friends with Charles Forster Smith.

Career
From 1876 to 1881, Baskervill taught at Wofford College alongside Smith and James H. Kirkland.  In 1878-79 he returned to study in Leipzig, and in the summer of 1880, returned to Leipzig to finish his doctorate.  Beginning in 1881, Baskervill taught at Vanderbilt University. Together with Smith, who also taught at Vanderbilt, and George Washington Cable, he ran an organization known as the Open Letter Club. Essie Samuels notes this was "a loosely organized attempt to disseminate liberal propaganda concerning civil rights and education for the Negro in the South between 1887 and 1890."

Personal life
He was the son-in-law of Methodist Bishop and Vanderbilt University co-founder Holland Nimmons McTyeire.

Death
He died in 1899.

Bibliography
 An outline of Anglo-Saxon grammar (from the appendix of Harrison & Baskervill's Anglo-Saxon dictionary), in 1887 
An English Grammar with J. W. Sewell, in 1896 
Irwin Russell, in 1896 
Charles Egbert Craddock, in 1896 
Joel Chandler Harris, in 1896 
Maurice Thompson, in 1896 
Sidney Lanier, in 1896
Anglo-Saxon Prose Reader Reader for Beginners with J. A. Harrison, in 1898 
The Elements of English Grammar with J. W. Sewell, in 1900 
A School Grammar of the English language (Baskervill-Sewell English course), in 1903

References

External links
 Biography of Baskerville from Southern Writers @ GoogleBooks
 
 

1850 births
1899 deaths
Randolph–Macon College alumni
Anglo-Saxon studies scholars
American literary critics
American non-fiction writers
Vanderbilt University faculty
American academics of English literature
19th-century American journalists
American male journalists
19th-century American male writers
People from Fayette County, Tennessee
American expatriates in Germany
19th-century American businesspeople